Lac du Val is a lake in the Jura department of France.

Val